Lee Howey (born 1 April 1969) is an English former footballer who played primarily as a defender. Howey began his career at Bishop Auckland, before moving to Sunderland where he spent the majority of his career. He later player for Burnley, Northampton Town, Forest Green Rovers and Nuneaton Borough.

Lee now works for payments company Trust Payments as Head of strategic sales.

Career

Howey was born in Sunderland. He started out as an apprentice at Ipswich Town, followed by a brief spell in Belgium with AS Hemptinne. In 1993, he was signed by Terry Butcher from local club Bishop Auckland, for Sunderland in March 1993. He made his debut for the club in May 1993 against Portsmouth at Roker Park. The following two seasons saw him in and out of the squad, making 38 league and cup appearances during the two years, mostly from the substitutes bench. It wasn't until the arrival of manager Peter Reid that Howey began to see regular first team action, playing 30 times during the club's Championship winning season, including 18 starts.

Howey scored a late equaliser at Fratton Park to secure a 2–2 draw with Portsmouth in February 1996. The goal proved to be a crucial turning point, as it set Sunderland off on an 18-match unbeaten run that won them the league.

However, Sunderland struggled to cope with life in the Premiership and Howey was allowed to leave the club following the club's relegation back to Football League First Division on the final day of the season. Howey made just 12 appearances that season.

It was Burnley who splashed out £200,000 for the Wearsider. He scored on his debut against Lincoln City in the League Cup. However this proved to be his only goal for the club, and Howey's career at the Lancashire club wasn't a success, and he eventually moved on to Northampton in February 1999 after a four-month loan period. Howey moved again two years later, completing a free transfer to Conference side Forest Green Rovers in 2001, before finishing his career at Nuneaton Borough later in the season.

Although primarily a central defender, Howey played up front a number of times during his career, and is considered to be comfortable in either role.

He is the older brother of former Newcastle United and England defender Steve Howey. A well known football chant is regularly sung by Sunderland fans about Lee and his brother.

Howey's writing skills have seen him signed up by Westminster based Biteback Publishing. His humorous memoir, Massively Violent and Decidedly Average, was released in February 2018

Honours

Player
Sunderland
Football League First Division: 1995–96

References

1969 births
Living people
Footballers from Sunderland
Association football defenders
English footballers
Premier League players
Sunderland A.F.C. players
Burnley F.C. players
Northampton Town F.C. players
Forest Green Rovers F.C. players
Nuneaton Borough F.C. players
Bishop Auckland F.C. players
English Football League players